Prof. K. U. Arunan is the member of 14th Kerala Legislative Assembly. He represented Irinjalakkuda constituency and belongs to Communist Party of India (Marxist).

In 2017, Communist Party of India (Marxist) Thrissur district leadership had sought an explanation from him for inaugurating a program organized by the Rashtriya Swayamsevak Sangh.

References

Living people
Communist Party of India (Marxist) politicians from Kerala
People from Thrissur district
Kerala MLAs 2016–2021
Place of birth missing (living people)
1947 births